Vladimir Morozov may refer to:

Vladimir Morozov (director/writer), Russian film director and screenwriter
Vladimir Nikolayevich Morozov (footballer) (born 1977), Russian footballer
Vladimir Morozov (figure skater) (born 1992), Russian pair skater
Vladimir Morozov (swimmer) (born 1992), Russian swimmer
Vladimir Ivanovich Morozov (1940) (1940 – 2023), Soviet canoer who competed from the mid-1960s to the early 1970s
Vladimir Ivanovich Morozov (born 1952), Soviet canoer who competed in the late 1970s
Vladimir Morozov (diplomat), Russian diplomat, see List of Ambassadors of Russia to Brunei
Vladimir Morozov, former treasurer of Russian private military contractor E.N.O.T. Corp.